Pathardeva is a constituency of the Uttar Pradesh Legislative Assembly covering the city of Pathardeva in the Deoria district of Uttar Pradesh, India.

Pathardeva is one of five assembly constituencies in the Deoria Lok Sabha constituency. Since 2008, this assembly constituency is numbered 338 amongst 403 constituencies.

Election results

2022

2022

2017
Bharatiya Janta Party candidate Surya Pratap Shahi won in last Assembly election of 2017 Uttar Pradesh Legislative Elections defeating Samajwadi Party candidate Shakir Ali by a margin of 42,997 votes.

Members of Legislative Assembly

See also
 Deoria district
 Deoria Lok Sabha constituency

References

External links
 

Assembly constituencies of Uttar Pradesh
Deoria district